The 1838 St Ives by-election was an election held on 24 May 1838. The by-election was brought about due to the death of the incumbent Conservative MP, James Halse. It was won by the Conservative candidate William Tyringham Praed.

References

1838 in England
1838 elections in the United Kingdom
By-elections to the Parliament of the United Kingdom in Cornish constituencies
May 1838 events
Politics of Cornwall
19th century in Cornwall